D.C. United Women was an American soccer club based in Washington, D.C. that competed in the USL W-League, the second tier of women's soccer in the United States. The team was an affiliate of Major League Soccer club, D.C. United but operated independently by Washington Soccer Properties, LLC.  To participate in the new professional National Women's Soccer League for the 2013 season, the team reformed as Washington Spirit in December 2012.

History

Founding
D.C. United Women were announced on March 29, 2011, as part of a partnership with some of the owners of the Northern Virginia Majestics, through a newly founded group named Washington Soccer Properties. As a part of the agreement in for the 2011 season, D.C. United Women competed in the Northeast Division of the W-League Eastern Conference, while the Majestics competed in the Atlantic Division of the Eastern Conference. While Washington Soccer Properties does control most aspects of the team, D.C. United does provide oversight, assistance, and support. Washington Soccer Properties purchased the W-League franchise vacated by Washington Freedom Futures when the team was disbanded following the sale of its senior team Washington Freedom who moved to Boca Raton, Florida and became magicJack. During the off-season between 2011 and 2012, Washington Soccer Properties ownership group severed ties with like owners involved with Northern Virginia Majestics, and operate entirely independently from that team as a result.

2011 season

In their first season, D.C. United Women played 10 league games, winning five, drawing three and losing two. They ended the season with four straight victories and finished in third place in the Northeast Division. Defender and co-captain Marisa Abegg was named to the W-League All-Conference Team for the Eastern Conference. For their inaugural season, D.C. United Women's average home attendance for the 2011 season was over 800 fans, with D.C. United Women having five home games at the Maryland SoccerPlex. They won the W-League Rookie Club of the Year award for their performance during the 2011 season.

2012 season

For 2012, the W-League's Eastern Conference expanded to a 12-game schedule, and D.C. United Women moved to the Atlantic Division where they played Dayton Dutch Lions, Fredericksburg Impact, Northern Virginia Majestics, and Virginia Beach Piranhas three times each during the regular season. They finished the regular season with eleven wins, no losses, and one draw, good enough for first place in the Atlantic Division and the Eastern Conference and for a tie as W-League regular-season champions with the Pali Blues.

That status gave them hosting rights for the Eastern Conference playoffs,  where they defeated the Virginia Beach Piranhas, 3–0, in the semifinals,  and the Charlotte Lady Eagles, 3–0, in the final. They went on to the W-League Final Four, where they lost to the host Ottawa Fury, 1–0, then finished third by downing the Quebec City Amiral on penalty kicks, 1–1 (7–6).

The team received the W-League's 2012 Fair Play and Media Awards. Marisa Abegg, Hayley Siegel, and Mikaela Howell made the All-Eastern Conference team. Additionally, Howell made W-League history by being the first player ever to be named to the Team of the Week five weeks in a row, culminating in being named Player of the Week in Week 6 of the season.

Players and staff

2012 roster 
As of July 27, 2012

Coaches
 Michael Jorden 2011–present
 Cindi Harkes 2011–present

Season results

Key 

Regular season
 GP = Games played
 W = Won
 L = Lost
 T = Tied
 GF = Goals for
 GA = Goals against
 Pts = Points
 Pos = Final position

League
 W-League = USL W-League

National Cup
 QR1 = First Qualifying Round
 QR2 = Second Qualifying Round
 QR3 = Third Qualifying Round
 R1 = First Round
 R2 = Second Round
 R3 = Third Round
 QF = Quarterfinals
 SF = Semifinals
 F = Final

Playoffs
 C-SF = Conference Semifinals
 C-F = Conference Finals
 SF = League Semifinals
 F = League Finals

References

External links 
 

 
D.C. United
Association football clubs established in 2011
Women's soccer clubs in the United States
USL W-League (1995–2015) teams
2011 establishments in Washington, D.C.
Phoenix clubs (association football)